The Referee is a 2010 Swedish critically acclaimed, award-winning documentary film produced by Freedom From Choice AB and Sveriges Television about Swedish top football referee Martin Hansson and his controversial journey to ref at the 2010 FIFA World Cup in South Africa.

Award-winning filmmaker Mattias Löw decided to follow the former firefighter from the village of Holmsjö in Blekinge, southern Sweden for a year that turned out to be the most dramatic in Martin Hansson's life.

The film features French football player Thierry Henry, former FIFA president Sepp Blatter, Arsenal F.C. manager Arsène Wenger, former football star Pelé, Swedish Football Association, Swedish top coaches Janne Andersson and Mikael Stahre in addition to referee boss Bo Karlsson and acclaimed journalist and author Erik Niva.

Reception
 The Guardian, UK - "This is a gem of a documentary."
 Le Figaro, France - "A very engaging dark chapter."
 Dagens Nyheter, Sweden - "An outstanding, entertaining and exciting movie."
 The New York Times, USA - "A perceptive documentary on soccer refereeing (...) a masterful portrait."
 Svenska Dagbladet, Sweden - "A nail-biter with a stylish dramaturgy."
 USA Today, USA - "This documentary is spectacularly intricate."
 Financial Times, UK - "Hansson’s story has meaning beyond football."
 Empire, UK - "One for the football fans."
 Howard Webb, 2010 FIFA World Cup Final Referee - "A very interesting documentary."

References
Sources

Notes

External sources
 
 
 

Documentary films about sportspeople
Swedish short documentary films
2010 films
2010 short documentary films
2010s Swedish-language films
Documentary films about association football
Sveriges Television original programming
Films directed by Tomas Mattias Löw
2010s Swedish films